The Dutry Baronetcy, of the City of London, was a title in the Baronetage of Great Britain. It was created on 19 June 1716 for Dennis Dutry, a wealthy London merchant and director of the Honourable East India Company. He was childless and the title became extinct on his death in 1728.

Dutry baronets, of the City of London (1716)
Sir Dennis Dutry, 1st Baronet (died 1728)

References

Extinct baronetcies in the Baronetage of Great Britain